Jasa Veremalua  (born 29 May 1988) is a Fijian rugby union player who plays for the San Diego Legion in Major League Rugby (MLR). He also plays for the Fiji sevens team.
He is from Korotogo Village in the Nadroga Navosa Province.

Youth and early career
Jasa Veremalua was born and raised in Korotogo, Baravi, Nadroga and he started his career playing rugby in the local 7's competition. He has been playing for the famous Red Rock 7's Team since 2012. His father died in 2005 when he was just 19. He regards his Red Rock coach, Lote Rasiga as a father-figure

He attended Sigatoka Methodist Primary School then Sigatoka Methodist College and then went on to St Thomas High School in Lautoka. He then attended Fiji National University in Ba to do his Diploma in Automobile and Road Transport studies. He joined Senibiau Rugby Club in Nadroga in 2006 and later joined Natabua Rugby club from 2010–2011.

In 2012, he was named best player won the Campese-Serevi Medal during the Coral Coast 7's.

National team
He was later selected by the then Fiji 7's coach, Alifereti Dere into the 7's team. In March 2013, he was offered a contract by Stade Toulousain to play in the Top 14 competition but due to an injury, the offer was taken back.

In 2016, his performance in the 2016 USA Sevens saw him win the DHL Impact player of the tournament.

He was also instrumental in helping Fiji win their 2nd title in a row after Fiji took out the 2015–16 World Rugby Sevens Series during the 2016 London Sevens by reaching the cup quarterfinals. He was crowned the  DHL Impact Player of the 2015‑16 7s series as well as making the Dream Team of the series.

References

External links

 
 
 Zimbio Bio
 Ultimate Rugby profile

Fijian rugby union players
Fiji international rugby sevens players
People from Nadroga-Navosa Province
1988 births
Living people
Rugby union centres
Rugby union wings
Pacific Islanders rugby union players
I-Taukei Fijian people
Fijian people of I-Taukei Fijian descent
Rugby union flankers
Male rugby sevens players
Rugby sevens players at the 2016 Summer Olympics
Olympic rugby sevens players of Fiji
Olympic gold medalists for Fiji
Olympic medalists in rugby sevens
Medalists at the 2016 Summer Olympics
Commonwealth Games medallists in rugby sevens
Commonwealth Games silver medallists for Fiji
Rugby sevens players at the 2018 Commonwealth Games
San Diego Legion players
Tel Aviv Heat players
Medallists at the 2018 Commonwealth Games
Fijian expatriate rugby union players
Fijian expatriate sportspeople in the United States
Expatriate rugby union players in the United States
Expatriate rugby union players in Israel
Fijian expatriate sportspeople in Israel